Vicinity may refer to:

Vicinity aka surroundings
Vicinity Motor Corp., a bus manufacturer in Canada
Vicinity card aka NFC-V, a wireless card following ISO/IEC 15693
Vicinity Corporation, who provided MapBlast web mapping service in the 1990s